Gonianotus is a genus of true bugs belonging to the family Rhyparochromidae.

The species of this genus are found in Europe.

Species:
 Gonianotus angusticollis Linnavuori, 1953 
 Gonianotus barbarus Montandon, 1890

References

Rhyparochromidae